Johnny Maestro and the Brooklyn Bridge is a 1993 recorded and released collection of classic songs by The Brooklyn Bridge and The Crests, as well as other notable doo wop songs.

Track listing
"The Angels Listened In"
"Gee"
"Isn't It Amazing"
"Sweetest One"
"Trouble in Paradise"
"Six Nights a Week"
"Pretty Little Angel"
"What a Surprise"
"Step by Step"
"I Thank The Moon"
"My Juanita"
"Sixteen Candles"
"Medley of Del Satins songs recorded with Dion DiMucci: Ruby Baby, Runaround Sue, The Wanderer"
"Your Husband, My Wife"
"Caroline"
"Little Bitty Pretty One"
"Blessed Is The Rain"
"Requiem"
"Unchained Melody"
"Free As The Wind"
"Welcome Me Love"
"My Prayer"
"The Worst That Could  Happen"
"Lonely Teardrops"
"You'll Never Walk Alone"

References

Johnny Maestro & the Brooklyn Bridge albums
1993 albums